Musa ka Musalla is a peak standing at an altitude of about  at the junction of Siran and Kaghan Valleys in Himalayas.

Etymology
The name Musa ka Musalla translates to Moses' mat. The legend has it that a shepherd named Musa used to pray there at the peak. There is also a shrine at the top probably of the same shepherd who is revered to as a saint by locales.

Routes 
The peak is accessible via three routes in summers but all needs hours of trekking. 
 Balakot to Nadi Bangla and Kund Bangla route
 Paras to Sharran forest route
 Shinkiari to Mandagucha route
The Shinkiari to Manda Gucha route is the most accessible route to reach the peak.

See also
Malika Parbat
Lalazar

References

Mountains of Khyber Pakhtunkhwa
Four-thousanders of the Himalayas